Răculești is a commune in Criuleni District, Moldova. It is composed of two villages, Bălășești and Răculești.

References

Communes of Criuleni District